Prusa or Prousa, or Prusa near Olympus or Prusa under Olympus (Προῦσα ἐπὶ τῷ Ὀλύμπῳ, Προῦσα πρὸς τῷ Ὀλύμπῳ), was a town of ancient Bithynia or of Mysia, situated at the northern foot of Mysian Olympus. Pliny the Elder states that the town was built by Hannibal during his stay with Prusias I, which can only mean that it was built by Prusias, whose name it bears, on the advice of Hannibal. It is acknowledged by Dion Chrysostomus, who was a native of the town in the first and second centuries, that it was neither very ancient nor very large. It was, however, as Strabo remarks well governed, continued to flourish under the Roman emperors, and was celebrated for its warm baths that bore the name of the "royal waters." Under the Byzantine emperors it suffered much during the wars against the Ottoman Turks; when at last it fell into their hands, it was for a time the capital of their empire under the name of Bursa, which it still bears.

Its site is occupied by the modern city of Bursa, Asiatic Turkey.

See also
List of ancient Greek cities

References

Populated places in Bithynia
Populated places in ancient Mysia
Former populated places in Turkey
Roman towns and cities in Turkey
Former national capitals
Populated places established in the 2nd century BC